The Indian-head test pattern is a test card that gained widespread adoption during the black-and-white television broadcasting era as an aid in the calibration of television equipment. It features a drawing of a Native American wearing a headdress surrounded by numerous graphic elements designed to test different aspects of broadcast display. The card was created by RCA to be the standard image for their TK-1 monoscope, a simple video camera capable of producing only the image embedded within it. The pattern was introduced in 1939 and over the following two decades became a fixture of television broadcast across North America and (often in modified form) abroad until it was obsoleted by the rise of color television in the 1960s.

Features and use 

The Indian-head test pattern was created by RCA at their factory in Harrison, New Jersey. Each element of the card was designed to measure a specific technical aspect of television broadcast so that an experienced engineer could, at a glance, identify problems. The card contains elements used to measure aspect ratio, perspective, framing, linearity, frequency response, differential gain, contrast, and brightness. The grid and circles were used for perspective, framing and linearity. The tapered lines (marked with 20, 25, 30, and 35) were used for resolution and frequency response. The thin lines marked from 575 to 325 on one side and 300 to 50 on the other side referred to lines of resolution. The gray bands emerging from the center off to the lower right and upper left were for differential gain, contrast, and white level.

The pattern began with the Indian-head portrait created in August 1938 by an artist named Brooks using pencil, charcoal, ink and zinc oxide. For about a year the portrait, which  contains several identifiable shades of gray from Zone VIII texture in the white feathers to Zone II texture in the black hair, was entire test pattern, but in 1939 the portrait was incorporated into the current pattern of calibrated lines and shapes.

Television stations would produce the image of the Indian-head test pattern in two ways. First, they would use a monoscope in which the pattern was permanently embedded, which was capable of producing the image with a high degree of consistency due to the device's simplicity. This image was used to calibrate monitors in the station. Second, stations would use a cardboard-mounted lithograph of the test pattern (typically attached to a rolling easel in each TV studio); videographing the lithograph would create a second image that could be compared against the monoscope-created control image.

The test pattern was useful for the calibration of home television sets as well as television studio equipment, so the image was routinely broadcast outside hours of programming. (It was often accompanied by an audio test tone for the purposes of calibrating aural receiver was working.)

As a cultural icon 
From the late-1950s the test pattern gradually began to be seen less frequently, after fewer sign-offs, on fewer stations, and for shorter periods in the morning, since new and improved TV broadcast equipment required less adjusting. In later years the test pattern was transmitted for as little as a minute after sign-off while the transmitter engineer logged required Federal Communications Commission-US/Industry Canada transmitter readings before cutting power.

The Indian-head test pattern became obsolete in the 1960s with the debut of color television; from that point onward, an alternate test card of SMPTE color bars (and its immediate predecessors), or colorized versions of the NBC/CBS-derived "bullseye" patterns became the test card of choice. Since the 1990s, most television stations in the United States have broadcast continuously without regular sign-offs, instead running infomercials, networked overnight news shows, syndicated reruns, cartoons, or old movies; thus, the broadcast of test patterns has become mostly obsolete (though they are still used in post-production and broadcast facilities to check color and signal paths). 

Nevertheless, the Indian-head test pattern persists as a symbol of early television. Many U.S. television stations chose the image of the Indian-head card to be their final image broadcast when their analog signals signed off for the final time between February 17 and June 12, 2009, as part of the digital television transition in the United States.

A variant of the card appeared on theatrical release posters for "Weird Al" Yankovic's 1989 film UHF. It was sold as a night-light from 1997 to 2005 by the Archie McPhee company, reminiscent of the times when a fairly common late-night experience was to fall asleep while watching the late movie, only to awaken to the characteristic sine wave tone accompanying the Indian-head test pattern on a black-and-white TV screen. The test card also featured in the opening sequence of the early 1960s science fiction anthology The Outer Limits.

Artifacts
Nearly all of the hard-to-open, steel-shielded monoscope tubes were junked with their Indian-head test pattern target plates still inside, but many of the board-mounted lithographs survive. 

The master art for both the portrait and the pattern design was discovered in a dumpster by a wrecking crew worker as the old RCA factory in Harrison, New Jersey was being demolished in 1970. The worker kept the art for over 30 years before selling it to a collector.

International variants 

The Indian head was also used by the Canadian Broadcasting Corporation (CBC) in Canada in conjunction with its own monochrome test pattern, following the Canadian national anthem sign-off in the evening, and during its final years in the late-1970s and early-1980s it was shown before sign-on in the morning, after the showing of the SMPTE color bars. 

It was also used by Rhodesia Television (RTV) during British colonial times (varying between Northern and Southern Rhodesia) following the playing of "God Save the Queen" at closedown. 

This test pattern was later used by the Venezuelan TV channel Venevision, in conjunction with the RMA Resolution Chart 1946, until the late-1970s before signing on with the Venezuelan national anthem. Telesistema Mexicano (now Televisa) stations also used this test pattern until the late-1960s immediately after playing the Mexican national anthem at sign-off. 

In the Dominican Republic, the Indian-head pattern was used by its public broadcaster Corporación Estatal de Radio y Televisión (CERTV) in the late-1960s and 1970s (in conjunction with the EIA 1956 resolution chart test card) after playing the National Anthem of the Dominican Republic at sign-off. 

In Sweden the Indian head was used in test transmissions from the KTH Royal Institute of Technology in Stockholm alongside the RMA Resolution Chart 1946, Telefunken T05 test card, as well as other experimental test cards from Televerket and Chalmers University of Technology from 1948 until November 1958 when it was replaced by the Sveriges Radio TV (now Sveriges Television) test card. 

Saudi Broadcasting Authority in Saudi Arabia also formerly used a modified version of the Indian head test pattern, with the Emblem of Saudi Arabia replacing the Indian head drawing, from 1954 until 1982 when it was replaced with a heavily modified Philips PM5544 test card. 

The Indian head was also used in Brazil by Rede Tupi, both as a test pattern and as part of a television ident, from its launch in 1950 until it became the first Brazilian television network to adopt colour television in 1971–1972. 

The Indian head pattern was also used by Kuwait Television in Kuwait from its launch of television services in 1961 until it adopted colour television in the mid-1970s.

In Italy, the pattern was adapted and modified by RAI for its monochrome test cards, used from 1961–77.

Notes

References

External links 
 – rescued from an RCA dumpster in 1970
Picture and detailed description of an RCA TK-1 test pattern generator (monoscope)
 mire.project – Street art work about test patterns

Broadcasting
Interstitial television shows
Native Americans in popular culture
Television presentation
Television terminology
Test cards